Michael Beecher may refer to:

Michael Beecher (politician) (1673–1726), Irish MP for Baltimore
Michael Beecher (actor) (1939–1993), Australian actor and model